Canopy is a 2013 Australian/Singaporean psychological suspense war film, written and directed by Aaron Wilson and starring Khan Chittenden and Mo Tzu-yi. Set against the backdrop of the Battle of Singapore in World War II, the film is nearly wordless.

Plot
In 1942, war between the Allies and the Japanese rages in the jungles of Singapore. Jim (Khan Chittenden), a Flight Lieutenant in the Royal Australian Air Force, awakens to find himself hanging from a tree by his parachute, shot down in action. Disentangling himself he realises that he has lost his pistol, his only form of defence but manages to salvage his survival gear and sets off into the jungle, narrowly avoiding a Japanese patrol.

Making his way through mud, swamp and a field full of Japanese propaganda leaflets, he eventually runs into Chinese guerrilla fighter Seng (Morning Mo Tzu-Yi) from the Dalforce who has also been separated from his unit behind enemy lines. They have another close encounter with a Japanese patrol and elect to set off together to aid each other in reaching friendly territory, despite not being able to speak the other's language.

Early on in their travels Seng is aggrieved to find the body of a comrade he was close to. They are briefly separated when Jim is left to contemplate the scene but he is alerted to Seng's location by the sound of gunfire. Jim is forced to rush to Seng's aid as the guerrilla collapses from a gunshot sustained to the abdomen, the Australian being forced to perform emergency surgery to retrieve the bullet with only bare hands and his sparse survival kit while simultaneously having to keep Seng silent to avoid the attention of the Japanese patrol.

The following night, flashbacks of his 36 hours in the jungle are interrupted as Seng wakes Jim to alert him to another Japanese patrol walking right by them, before the pair are briefly forced to fight off venomous insects from the tree which they had been sleeping under. As they settle back under the tree for the night, Seng shows Jim a photo of his family, causing Jim to drift into a reverie remembering his own wife back home. Jim awakes from his memories to find it is the next morning. He and Seng share a moment together in which they finally learn each other's names before Japanese soldiers find and separate them. As Seng is killed in cold blood by the patrol's officer, troops drag Jim away to a truck and he is driven off to the Japanese base. He watches helplessly out of the back of the truck, knowing that his bid for freedom has finally failed.  A time skip then shows Jim back home in Australia, standing in a field of wheat.

Cast
 Khan Chittenden as Jim
 Morning Mo Tzu-Yi as Seng
 Robert Menzies 
 Edwina Wren as Jim's wife

Production

Director Aaron Wilson developed the script while he was undertaking a filmmaker residency program with Objectifs Centre for Filmmaking and Photography in Singapore.

Filming took place over a period of two weeks in Singapore, in and around locations where actual fighting took place during the Japanese invasion of February 1942. These areas included Sungei Buloh wetlands, Bukit Brown Chinese Cemetery and Macritchie Reservoir. Additional filming was carried out in Australia in New South Wales, close to the township of Tocumwal.

Post-production of the film was partly financed using crowdfunding through Pozible.

Release

Canopy had its world premiere at the 2013 Toronto International Film Festival, and was selected for screening at other major film festivals, including Busan International Film Festival, Shanghai International Film Festival and International Film Festival Rotterdam.

Reception
On Rotten Tomatoes, a review aggregator, the film has a score of 74% based on 19 reviews.

Accolades
 Grand Prize - Antipodes Film Festival Saint Tropez 2014 
 Best Director - Festival International de Cinéma en Champagne-Ardenne 2014 
 Special Jury Mention - Abu Dhabi Film Festival 2013

References

External links 

 
2013 films
Australian thriller films
Australian World War II films
Pacific War films
Films about shot-down aviators
Films set in Singapore
Films shot in Singapore
Films shot in New South Wales
2013 psychological thriller films
2010s survival films
2010s war films